The 2012 Japanese Formula 3 Championship was an open wheel motor racing series held for Formula 3 cars based in Japan. It was the 34th edition of the Japanese Formula 3 Championship. It commenced on 14 April at Suzuka and ended on 14 October at Fuji Speedway after 15 races held at seven race meetings.

Ryō Hirakawa of the RSS team has dominated the championship and won the title.

Teams and drivers
All teams were Japanese-registered.

Race calendar and results
All rounds were held in Japan.

Championship standings

Drivers' Championships
Points are awarded as follows:

Overall

National Class

Teams' Championships
Points are awarded for races as follows:

Engine Tuners' Championship
Points are awarded for races as follows:

References

External links
 Official Site 

Formula Three
Japanese Formula 3 Championship seasons
Japan
Japanese Formula 3